Lemercier is a settlement in Guadeloupe in the commune of Le Moule, on the island of Grande-Terre.  It is located to the east of La Rosette and Palais-Sainte-Marguerite; Le Moule is to its west.

Populated places in Guadeloupe